Kulpmont is a borough in Northumberland County, Pennsylvania, United States. The population was 2,924 at the 2010 census.

History
The Borough of Kulpmont was incorporated August 24, 1915. Its development was aided by Monroe H. Kulp.

Geography
Kulpmont is located at  (40.793177, -76.473440).

Demographics

As of the census of 2000, there were 2,985 people, 1,338 households, and 837 families residing in the borough. The population density was 3,189.6 people per square mile (1,226.1/km2). There were 1,532 housing units at an average density of 1,637.0 per square mile (629.3/km2). The racial makeup of the borough was 98.89% White, 0.47% African American, 0.03% Asian, 0.23% from other races, and 0.37% from two or more races. Hispanic or Latino of any race were 0.54% of the population.

There were 1,338 households, out of which 22.6% had children under the age of 18 living with them, 49.5% were married couples living together, 9.5% had a female householder with no husband present, and 37.4% were non-families. 34.5% of all households were made up of individuals, and 20.0% had someone living alone who was 65 years of age or older. The average household size was 2.22 and the average family size was 2.85.

In the borough the population was spread out, with 19.6% under the age of 18, 5.7% from 18 to 24, 25.3% from 25 to 44, 24.1% from 45 to 64, and 25.3% who were 65 years of age or older. The median age was 45 years. For every 100 females, there were 92.1 males. For every 100 females age 18 and over, there were 87.1 males.

The median income for a household in the borough was $29,263, and the median income for a family was $34,674. Males had a median income of $26,679 versus $22,075 for females. The per capita income for the borough was $16,033. About 6.7% of families and 9.8% of the population were below the poverty line, including 11.0% of those under age 18 and 10.1% of those age 65 or over.

Government

The mayor of Kulpmont is Nicholas Bozza The borough is served by 7 council people. They are:

 Robert Slaby, President
 Stephen Bielskie, Vice President
 Stephen Motyka
 Joseph Dowkus
 Robert Chesney, Sr.
 Michael Sinopoli
 Robert Fanella

Education
Kulpmont is served by the Mount Carmel Area School District.

Notable people
 Joe Baksi (1922-1977) was a top heavyweight boxing contender
Bob Chesney (1977- ) Current head football coach at Holy Cross (FCS Division 1).
U.S. District Court Magistrate Judge Lisa Pupo Lenihan

  George Evans (1920-2001) Commercial artist and illustrator whose work appeared in EC comics, Comics Illustrated, Boy's Life, and who wrote and illustrated the comic strip Secret Agent Corrigan.
Marlin Bressi — Author

References

External links
 Borough of Kulpmont Official Website

Municipalities of the Anthracite Coal Region of Pennsylvania
Populated places established in 1915
Boroughs in Northumberland County, Pennsylvania
1915 establishments in Pennsylvania